The Muckamore Abbey Hospital is a health facility on Abbey Road, Muckamore, County Antrim, Northern Ireland. It is managed by the Belfast Health and Social Care Trust.

History
The facility, which is located just south of a ruined Augustinian priory, opened as a mental health facility in 1949. A "special care colony" for people with an intellectual disability, with capacity of up to 1,000 patients, was added in 1958. Following a 2019 investigation into alleged abuses at the hospital, the Department of Health stated that it was considering a planned closure of the hospital.

References

Further reading

Belfast Health and Social Care Trust
Hospitals established in 1949
1949 establishments in Ireland
Hospital buildings completed in 1949
Health and Social Care (Northern Ireland) hospitals
Hospitals in County Antrim